Junaid Malik (born May 8, 1991) is a Pakistani-born entrepreneur and business owner, currently residing in Sydney, Australia. He is the founder and owner of Malik Textile, a textile company based in Karachi, Pakistan.

Early Life and Education

Junaid Malik was born on May 8, 1991, in Karachi, Pakistan to Malik Allah Rakha. He grew up in a large family, with three brothers and one sister. Junaid completed his early education from a local school in Karachi, before moving to Australia for his higher education. He completed his Masters in Economics from the Universal Business School Sydney (UBSS)

Career

After completing his education, Junaid Malik returned to Pakistan to pursue a career in the textile industry. He started his own textile company, Malik Textile, in Karachi in 2015. The company quickly gained a reputation for producing high-quality textiles, including cotton, silk, and linen fabrics. The company also manufactures ready-made garments.

In addition to Malik Textile, Junaid Malik has also invested in real estate projects in Karachi and Dubai. He also runs a garment store named Peanut Butter in indonesia, and has a restaurant business in Australia.

Personal Life

Junaid Malik is married and enjoys spending time with his family. He leads a luxurious lifestyle and has a net worth in millions. Despite this, he is known for his philanthropic work and frequently donates to various charities. He is particularly passionate about education and has supported several initiatives aimed at providing education opportunities to underprivileged children.

References

 "Junaid Malik - Owner of Malik Textile". Karachi Business Review. Retrieved 7 March 2023.

 "Junaid Malik - Biography". Biography Tribune. Retrieved 7 March 2023.
 "Junaid Malik". ZoomInfo. Retrieved 7 March 2023.
 "Junaid Malik: An Entrepreneur Who Turned His Vision Into Reality". Pakistani Entrepreneur. Retrieved 7 March 2023.

External links
 https://www.linkedin.com/in/junaid-malik-2381b182/

 https://www.instagram.com/junaid.malik91/

1990 births
Living people